A film Production Office is the administrative office responsible for managing a film production. The office is responsible to the Film Producer and includes the Production Manager, Assistant Director and one or more Production Assistants. Typically a Production Office is established in the pre-production phase and continues until at least post-production.

The Production Office usually includes positions such as, but not entirely made of, Production Supervisor, Production Office Coordinator, Assistant Production Office Coordinator, Production Secretary and Office Assistants (otherwise known or credited as Office PA's or Staff Assistants).

A Production Office will look different for each production depending on many variables including the type of film, the production company producing the film and the size of the budget of the film itself. A Production Office can be as small as one or two people (mostly seen in an independent film structure) or as big as ten or more on a film with a sizeable budget.

See also
 Filmmaking

References

Filmmaking occupations